This is a list of the top 40 singles of 1975 in New Zealand. In 1975, the New Zealand singles chart was based on sales alone. RIANZ began producing the Official Singles Chart on 2 May 1975. The year-end chart includes sales from this date, onward.

Chart
Key
 – Single of New Zealand origin

References

Top 40 singles
1975 record charts
Singles 1975
1970s in New Zealand music